= 1962 Indian parliamentary resolution on China =

Indian joint parliamentary resolution in 1962

The 1962 Indian parliamentary resolution on China is the resolution passed by the Parliament of India on 14 November 1962. The unanimous resolution adopted during Sino-Indian War pledged to get back the territory occupied by Chinese to the last inch.
